Vera Brosgol, also known as the Verabee (born August 2, 1984, in Moscow), is an Eisner Award and Harvey Award winning cartoonist and a graduate in Classical Animation of Sheridan College in Canada. She currently lives in Portland, Oregon. She worked for Laika Entertainment, where she did storyboards and concept art for their animation productions. Brosgol has also collaborated with Shaenon Garrity on L'il Mell and Sergio for Girlamatic and drawn several guest comics for John Allison's Scary Go Round.

Awards
Best Animated Film by a NW Filmmaker for Snow-Bo, Film Society of Portland's (2006)
Channel Frederator Podcast Darkly Award for Snow-Bo (2007)
Eisner Award for Best Publication for Young Adults (ages 12–17) for Anya's Ghost (2012)
Harvey Award for Best Original Graphic Publication for Younger Readers for Anya's Ghost (2012)
Caldecott Honor for Leave Me Alone! (2016)

Bibliography
 2002: "Babeland" (part of Mostly Acquisitions)
 2003: Wary Tales Anthology
 2002–2004: Return to Sender (discontinued)
 2004: "I Wish..." (part of Flight Volume One)
 2005: "Salmoning" (part of Flight Volume Two)
 2005: Hopeless Savages: B-sides: The Origin of the Dusted Bunnies (as co-illustrator)
 2007: "Little Trouble at the Big Top" (part of Flight Volume Four)
 2011: Anya's Ghost
 2015: "Olive's Story" (part of Gotham Academy: Endgame special)
 2016: Leave Me Alone!
 2018: Be Prepared!
 2019: The Little Guys

Filmography
 2005: Snow-Bo (animation)
 2005: Someone Is Going to Die (animation)
 2009: Coraline (storyboard artist)
 2012: ParaNorman (story artist)
 2014: The Boxtrolls (additional writing)
 2015: We Bare Bears (writer/storyboard artist: "The Road")
 2016: Bee and PuppyCat (storyboard artist)
 2022: Guillermo del Toro's Pinocchio (head of story)

References

External links
  Verabee, with extensive gallery
 
 Return to Sender 
 
 

1984 births
Canadian comics writers
Canadian female comics artists
Russian female comics artists
Living people
Canadian webcomic creators
Sheridan College animation program alumni
Date of birth missing (living people)
Canadian women cartoonists
Russian women cartoonists
Female comics writers
Canadian cartoonists
Artists from Moscow
21st-century Canadian women